Robert G. Devenyi FRCSC, FACS is a vitreoretinal surgeon and Professor of Ophthalmology and Vision Sciences at the University of Toronto. He is also the team ophthalmologist for the Toronto Maple Leafs of the National Hockey League.  Devenyi is Ophthalmologist-in-Chief and Director of Retinal Services at the University Health Network (UHN), which is affiliated with the University of Toronto. Devenyi is also the co-director of the Donald K. Johnson Eye Institute located at the Toronto Western Hospital, part of UHN. The DKJ Eye Institute is one of Canada's subspecialty ophthalmology facility.

At the University of Toronto, Devenyi directs fellowships in vitreoretinal surgery, researches and publishes in various areas associated with vitreoretinal ophthalmology, and focuses on research in retinopathies.  

Devenyi is the only surgeon in Canada who has successfully implanted the Argus II "bionic eye" implant for patients who are totally blind from degenerative diseases such as Retinitis Pigmentosa.

References

External links
UHN Profile
http://www.uhnophthalmology.com

Living people
Canadian ophthalmologists
Year of birth missing (living people)